Nada may refer to:

Culture
Nāda, a concept in ancient Indian metaphysics

Places
Nada, Hainan, China
Nada, Kentucky, an unincorporated community in the United States
Nada, Nepal, village in Achham District, Seti Zone
Nada, Texas, United States
Nada Station, a station on the JR Kobe Line, located in Hyogo, Japan
Nada Tunnel, a tunnel near Nada, Kentucky
Nada-ku, Kobe, one of nine wards of Kobe, Japan

People
 Nada (given name), a feminine given name in South Slavic languages, Arabic, and Italian
 Nađa, a feminine given name in South Slavic languages

People with the stage name
nada (English musician), alias of Steve Grainger, a UK electronica/ambient artist
Nada (singer) (born 1953), Italian singer
Nada (musician) (born 1991), Korean rapper and singer
NaDa, or Red_NaDa, Lee Yun-Yeol, South Korean professional StarCraft player

People with the surname
Youssef Nada (born 1931), Egyptian businessman and financial strategist

Arts, entertainment, and media

Films
Nada (1947 film), a 1947 Spanish film, directed by Edgar Neville, based on Carmen Laforet's novel
Nada (1974 film), a French film, also known as The Nada Gang, directed by Claude Chabrol in 1974, based on Jean-Patrick Manchette's novel

Music
Nada (German band), a German punk rock band

Albums
Nada (Los Freddy's album), 1979
Nada (Peter Michael Hamel album), 1977
Nada!, a 1985 album by Death In June

Songs
"Nada" (Belinda Peregrín song), 2013
"Nada" (Juanes song), 2000
"Nada" (Paula song), 2016
"Nada" (Prince Royce song), 2014
"Nada" (Shakira song), 2018
"Nada" (Tainy song), 2020
"Nada", a 2020 song by Christine and the Queens from the EP La Vita Nuova
"Nada", a 2006 song by La 5ª Estación from the album El Mundo Se Equivoca
"Nada", a 2008 song by Zoé from the album Reptilectric

Other arts, entertainment, and media
Nada (novel), a 1944 Spanish-language novel by Carmen Laforet
Nada (magazine), a Bosnian cultural magazine published between 1895 and 190
John Nada, the main character from John Carpenter's film They Live, portrayed by Roddy Piper

Other uses
Lady Master Nada, according to the New Age religion the Church Universal and Triumphant, the female Ascended master governing the "Sixth Ray"
Nada High School, in Hyogo, Japan
RK Nada, a rugby union club from Split, Croatia

Acronyms
NADA may stand for:
in the FDA lexicon, New Animal Drug Application
N-Arachidonoyl dopamine, a CB1 and TRPV1 agonist
National Aerospace Development Administration, the North Korean space agency
National Anti-Doping Agency, India
National Automobile Dealers Association
National Democratic Alternative (Serbia)
New Art Dealers Alliance
Quinolinate synthase, an enzyme

See also
 Nada Personal (disambiguation)
 Nadas (disambiguation)